Vortex is a KMG Afterburner at Thorpe Park, an amusement park in Chertsey, Surrey, England. It was installed in the Lost City area of the park in 2001. It opened on 25 May, seven weeks after the opening of the 2001 season.

Riders sit in seats arranged in a circle facing inwards, there are eight gondolas with four seats on each. After the over-the-shoulder restraints have been lowered and checked, the platform lowers. The seats then begin to rotate, and after approximately one rotation the ride begins to swing. The ride swings back and forth, swinging up to a maximum height of 20 metres and angle of 120 degrees at 15rpm. After several full height swings, the ride then begins to slow before coming to a halt, the platform is then raised and riders fast track and single rider questions operate.

References

External links
 Vortex at Thorpe Park's Official Site
 Vortex at Thorpe Park Mania
 Vortex at ThemeParks-UK

Thorpe Park
Amusement rides manufactured by KMG
Amusement rides introduced in 2001